General Keppel was launched in 1779, possibly under another name. She first appeared in British records in 1799 as a Liverpool-based privateer. A Spanish frigate captured her in 1801.

Career
General Keppel first appeared in Lloyd's Register (LR) in 1799.  

Captain John Smith acquired a letter of marque on 16 August 1799. At one point General Keppel, Smith, master, was at Gibraltar, having been dismasted.

While the slave ship  was on her way to Liverpool to Jamaica, a French privateer captured her. The same privateer had captured two other vessels of the Jamaica fleet. General Kepole recaptured Lune, which arrived at Liverpool on 19 September. A later mention in Lloyd's List stated that Lune had arrived at Liverpool with the Jamaica fleet, after having been recaptured by General Keppel. 

Captain James Finlayson acquired a letter of marque on 21 March 1801. He recaptured an American ship, and brought a ship out from Cadiz. The ship from Cadiz was Amizad, Flora, master, which arrived at Madeira.

On 14 June Finlayson had an engagement with the French privateer Mouche, of 22 guns and 250 men, which was in company with her prize, Hiram, Keene, master, from Demerara to Madeira. Hiram, with 60 Frenchmen aboard, soon sheared off, and went into Teneriffe. Mouche too left after an engagement that left her second captain dead and several men wounded, and her hull, masts, sails, and rigging damaged.

Fate
On 20 November 1801 the Spanish frigate Medea, of 40 or 44 guns, captured General Keppel in the Río de la Plata after a severe engagement that lasted three hours.

Notes

Citations

References
 
 

1779 ships
Privateer ships of Great Britain
Privateer ships of the United Kingdom
Captured ships